Attacus taprobanis is a moth of family Saturniidae. It is native to southern India and Sri Lanka. This species is very similar in morphology to the much more widely distributed Attacus atlas. It was once considered a subspecies of A. atlas.

Description
Attacus taprobanis is typically darker than A. atlas. The hyaline spots are slightly smaller. The hyaline streak on the forewing is smaller, and often absent in males. The wingspan about 170–220 mm, is probably the second largest after A. atlas.

Ecology
The larvae feed on various bushes and trees including Aglaia roxburghiana, 	
Berberis asiatica, Berberis thunbergii,	Berberis vulgaris, Cinnamomum, Cinnamomum camphora, Cinnamomum zeylanicum and Ligustrum. Adult moths do not take foods and survive on fat they have stored from their larval period, the females sitting most calm and emitting pheromones, that the active males can notice from a distance.

References

Saturniidae
Moths of Asia
Lepidoptera of India
Moths of Sri Lanka
Taxa named by Frederic Moore
Moths described in 1882